Leptinella dioica (syn. Cotula dioica), the hairless leptinella, is a species of flowering plant in the family Asteraceae, native to New Zealand, and introduced to Ireland. A mat-forming perennial useful as a ground cover, there are a number of cultivars, including 'Minima' and 'SealIsland'.

Subtaxa
The following subspecies are accepted:
Leptinella dioica subsp. dioica – North Island, South Island, doubtfully Antipodean Islands, introduced Ireland
Leptinella dioica subsp. monoica  – southern North Island

References

Anthemideae
Endemic flora of New Zealand
Garden plants of New Zealand
Flora of the North Island
Flora of the South Island
Plants described in 1852